Ace is a fictional character from the G.I. Joe: A Real American Hero toyline, comic books and animated series. He is the G.I. Joe Team's original fighter pilot and debuted in 1983.

Profile
His real name is Brad J. Armbruster, and his rank is Air Force captain O-3 in his initial release and in 1993, and was listed as major or O-4 in 1992, 1997, and 1998. Ace was born in Providence, Rhode Island. His primary military specialty is fixed wing pilot (single or multiple engine) and his secondary military specialty is intelligence operations.

Ace was originally the pilot for the Skystriker. He would rather fly planes than anything else, and worked during high school to pay for flying lessons. He spent a year flying pipelines in Alaska and two years stunt flying for movies, before he enlisted at age 22 in the USAF, and later transferred to the G.I. Joe team. Prior to joining the Joe Team he worked as a senior instructor for the USAF Fighter Weapons Squadron "The Aggressors" (pilot combat training school). Ace is a qualified expert in flying the F-5E Tiger II; the F-15 Eagle; the F-16 Fighting Falcon; the XP-14; as well as any F-class fighter. He is also a cutthroat poker player, who apparently never loses.

When G.I. Joe temporarily disbanded, Ace returned to flying stunts for movies. He gladly accepted the offer to return on reserve status when the team was reinstated.

Toys
Ace was first released as an action figure in 1983, packaged with the Skystriker. A new version of Ace was released as part of the Battle Copters line in 1992, this one with the name Wendall Armbruster. The figure was repainted and released as part of the Battle Corps line in 1993, packaged with the Ghoststriker X-16 fighter jet.

During the 30th Anniversary toy line, a new version of Ace has been released in 2011 contained in the Combat Jet Skystriker XP-14F.

Comics

Marvel Comics

In the Marvel Comics G.I. Joe series, he first appeared in issue #14 (August 1983). Ace is featured in issue #34, where he battles the Cobra pilot Wild Weasel in a dogfight over New Jersey. His co-pilot on the mission is fellow G.I. Joe Lady Jaye, while Wild Weasel has the Baroness as his co-pilot. Both pilots run out of missiles and ammunition. As they limp back to their respective bases, they give each other a salute. Neither co-pilot understands what is going on.

Ace is stationed aboard the USS Flagg when it is damaged by a tidal wave. It leaves the ship listing, thus increasing the danger of flight. Despite this, Ace takes off to give air cover to nearby endangered Joe members.

Ace appears in G.I. Joe Special Missions #28. He is part of the crew of the Joe spacecraft, the Defiant. His mission is to test out various stealth technologies. He works closely with Payload.

Action Force
In the Action Force continuity, Brad J. Armbruster was born in Montreal, Canada. He was part of a team who flew to the Amazonian Jungle to destroy a Cobra supply base. During the mission, the Skystriker came under attack from Cobra F.A.N.G.s and the engines failed, but Ace was able to refire them in air and then destroy the base. On the way back to the U.S.S. Flagg, the Skystriker was running out of fuel and the engines failed on arrival, but Ace was able to land on the deck with only one wheel destroyed. He subsequently fast flew Sci-Fi from Germany to the United Kingdom to deal with a Cobra bomb planted on the Tower Bridge in London. Ace and Lady Jaye were later part of a training mission in Norway that was attacked by Rattlers and a Night Raven. They managed to shoot down all Cobra planes.

Devil's Due
Ace returns to the Joe team, after it reforms in the pages of the Devil's Due G.I. Joe series. He flies support when the Joes invade Cobra Island during their second civil war. After another reformation of the team, Ace begins operating out of the Joe facility called "The Rock". He's been promoted to colonel. 

In an alternate continuity, Ace first appears as one of the responding pilots to unknown aircraft violating Presidential airspace.

Animated series

Sunbow
Ace first appeared in the Sunbow G.I. Joe animated series in the "A Real American Hero" mini-series, and was voiced by Pat Fraley. In the cartoon, Ace frequently appeared in the first season, and leads G.I. Joe Skystrikers in battles. He also had a rivalry with Wild Weasel, similar to the comics.

His first major role was in the episode "Cobra Stops the World", in which he and Duke scout the Amazon jungle via Skystriker in the Joes' search for the source of a Cobra broadcast's transmission, which has been hidden by a cloaking device. During an aerial battle, Ace flies through a gorge, outmaneuvering two Cobra Rattlers, but a third one shoots down his Skystriker as well as the Joes' parachutes, causing them to fall into the Amazon River. After swimming to shore, Duke and Ace are captured by Major Bludd and indigenous people allied with Cobra, who take them to a pit of snakes. Ace fakes an injury, which allows him and Duke to defeat them and escape. They soon find a Cobra airbase in the tribe's village near a diamond mine, learning about the source of the cloaking device. Ace steals a Rattler while Duke destroys the others. In the final battle, Ace pilots the stolen Rattler and helps defeat Cobra.

Ace's next major role was in "Cobra Soundwaves". In the episode, Ace, Gung-Ho and Roadblock are ambushed while flying in the Middle East, where Cobra plots to destroy a nation's oil supply. Ace shoots down a Rattler and the Joes follow the others, but are lured to a Cobra ultrasonic weapon that destroys their Skystrikers. All three Joes are captured and taken to the arena of a nearby Cobra base, where Cobra has a giant robotic crab attack them. Realizing it sees through infrared sensors, Ace creates fire with stones and has Gung-Ho distract the robot with fire while he knocks out two Crimson Guard watching them. He seizes their blasters for himself and Roadblock. Ace blasts a hole in the door for the Joes to escape, as well as the stone roof, which collapses on the robotic crab. The three seal off entrances in the cavern they are in, and reach a fork. Ace flips a coin, but Gung-Ho decides they go right. They reach a dead end, but Ace notices the ground is wet, so he plants their blasters in the sand and overcharges them. The ensuing explosion creates a large hole, through which Ace, Roadblock and Gung-Ho fall into a river, leading them to another hole in which they climb out. The three are found by Wild Bill and Scarlett. Ace later leads a group of Skystrikers toward Cobra's sonic weapon as a diversion, allowing Joes in gliders to attack.

In "The Germ", Ace and a team of Skystrikers try to fight a monstrous bacteria with missiles, only for the germ to deflect the missiles, one of which hits his plane. Ace borrows a crop duster from a farmer and uses to insecticide against the germ, but it repels as well and incapacitates Ace for a while. When the Joes carry out a plan to stop the bacteria with poison from apple seeds, Ace and the Skystriker team fire missiles in the ground and cause the germ to move toward an apple orchard.

In "The Wrong Stuff", Ace, Lady Jaye and Alpine fly into space to destroy a Cobra satellite controlling every television network. They encounter a Cobra space station, which destroys their Skystrikers with missiles. To prepare for an attack on the station, Ace oversees astronaut training for the Joes, finding a group of Joes that qualify. As the Joes enter space and begin their assault, Ace tumbles toward the sun. He is rescued by the others after the Joes escape the space station as it is about to explode.

G.I. Joe: The Movie
Ace appeared briefly in the 1987 animated film G.I. Joe: The Movie.

Inhumanoids
A character named Brad Armbruster appeared in the animated series Inhumanoids, also produced by Sunbow/Marvel. The character was voiced by Neil Ross. He first appeared in the episode "The Masterson Team", in which he is introduced as a U.S. Air Force pilot. Recovering from a hospital bed, Armbruster recounts how his plane was knocked down by the serpentine monster, Sslither, when he and his team were flying over Angkor Wat. The attack left him unable to walk, so the Earth Corps scientists provided him with a battlesuit constructed from his jet, circumventing his disability and also allowing him flight. In the final episode, "Auger... for President?", he uses the codename Sabre Jet. He and Soviet Army veteran Tankmaster save the day for the Earth Corps in their battle. Sabre Jet saves Auger, the mechanic of the Earth Corps, from being killed by the Inhumanoids monsters, and becomes a member of the Earth Corps in the end.

Screenwriter Flint Dille later confirmed that Sabre Jet is indeed Ace from G.I. Joe, despite their different appearances and voice actors, further emphasizing that G.I. Joe and Inhumanoids are in the same universe along with the Sunbow cartoons The Transformers and Jem.

Valor vs. Venom
Ace did not visibly appear in the direct-to-video CGI animated movie G.I. Joe: Valor vs. Venom, but his voice is heard during the battle to defend the Joes' secret base. He is voiced by Alistair Abell.

Video games
Ace is one of the featured characters in the 1985 G.I. Joe: A Real American Hero computer game.

References

External links
 Ace at JMM's G.I. Joe Comics Home Page

Comics characters introduced in 1983
Fictional characters from Rhode Island
Fictional colonels
Fictional fighter pilots
Fictional majors
Fictional military captains
Fictional United States Air Force personnel
G.I. Joe soldiers
Male characters in animated series
Male characters in comics